Ravish Kumar (born 5 December 1974) is an Indian journalist, author and media personality. He was the Senior Executive Editor of NDTV India. He hosted a number of programmes including the channel's flagship weekday show Prime Time, Hum Log, Ravish Ki Report, and Des Ki Baat.

Kumar has twice been conferred with Ramnath Goenka Excellence in Journalism Award for the Best Journalist of the Year and became the fifth Indian journalist to receive the Ramon Magsaysay Award in 2019.

Early life and education 
Kumar was born on 5 December 1974 in Jitwarpur village near Areraj in East Champaran district of Bihar, to Baliram Pandey. He obtained his high school education from Loyola High School, Patna. Later he moved to Delhi for higher studies. He graduated from Deshbandhu College, affiliated with the University of Delhi. Eventually he enrolled in post-graduate diploma in Hindi Journalism from the Indian Institute of Mass Communication.

Career

From 1994 to 2022 he was employed by NDTV India, eventually as Senior Director. He hosted a number of programmes including the channel's flagship weekday show Prime Time, Hum Log, Ravish Ki Report and Des Ki Baat.

He has received death threats in the past for his journalism.

On 30 November 2022, he resigned from NDTV a day after the channel’s founders and promoters Prannoy Roy and Radhika Roy resigned as directors on the board of RRPR Holding Private Limited (RRPRH).

Awards and accolades

Kumar has been conferred various awards for his work in journalism including the Ramon Magsaysay Award (2019). He has been two times recipients of the Ramnath Goenka Excellence in Journalism Award (2017, 2013) for the broadcast category in the Hindi language. The list continues with Gauri Lankesh Award for Journalism, first Kuldip Nayar journalism award (2017), Ganesh Shankar Vidyarthi Award for Hindi Journalism and Creative Literature (for 2010, awarded in 2014). He was included in the list of 100 most influential Indians (2016) by The Indian Express and also named journalist of the year by Mumbai Press Club.

Personal life
Kumar is married to Nayana Dasgupta who teaches History at the Lady Shri Ram College, University of Delhi. He has two daughters.

Books 
 The Free Voice: On Democracy, Culture and the Nation
Bolna Hi Hai : Loktantra, Sanskriti Aur Rashtra Ke Bare Mein (in Hindi)
Ishq Mein Shahar Hona (in Hindi)
Dekhate Rahiye (in Hindi)
Ravishpanti (in Hindi)
A City Happens In Love

See also 

 List of Indian journalists 
 Godi-media
WhatsApp University

References

External links
 

Living people
Indian male television journalists
NDTV Group
Delhi University alumni
People from Motihari
Journalists from Bihar
Indian bloggers
Indian political journalists
Male bloggers
Ramon Magsaysay Award winners
Indian Institute of Mass Communication alumni
1974 births